The 1967–68 Michigan Wolverines men's basketball team represented the University of Michigan in intercollegiate basketball during the 1967–68 season.  The team finished the season tied for seventh place in the Big Ten Conference with an overall record of 11–13 and 6–8 against conference opponents.

Dave Strack was in his eighth and final year as the team's coach.  Sophomore Rudy Tomjanovich was the team's leading scorer and rebounder with 471 points and 323 rebounds in 24 games for an average of 19.6 points and 13.5 rebounds per game.

Scoring statistics

Team players drafted into the NBA
Three players from this team were selected in the NBA Draft.

References

Michigan
Michigan Wolverines men's basketball seasons
Michigan Wolverines basketball
Michigan Wolverines basketball